The Cullen College of Engineering, one of twelve academic colleges at the University of Houston, was established in 1941 and is accredited by the Engineering Accreditation Commission of ABET. More than 5,000 students are enrolled in engineering courses—3,759 undergraduates, 1,312 master's and doctoral students. The Cullen College offers degree programs in biomedical, chemical, civil, computer, electrical, environmental, industrial, mechanical, subsea and petroleum engineering, with specialty programs in materials, and computer and systems engineering. The college's master's program in subsea engineering is the first of its kind in the United States. Its chemical and mechanical engineering programs have ranked among the top programs nationally.

Fourteen faculty members belong to the National Academy of Engineering.

Academics
The UH Cullen College of Engineering offers undergraduate and graduate programs through seven academic departments and two major programs:

Department of Biomedical Engineering
William A. Brookshire Department of Chemical and Biomolecular Engineering
Department of Civil and Environmental Engineering
Department of Electrical and Computer Engineering
Department of Industrial Engineering
Department of Mechanical Engineering
Department of Petroleum Engineering
Materials Engineering Program
Sasakawa International Center for Space Architecture
Subsea Engineering Program

The Cullen College also offers the Honors Engineering Program in association with The Honors College at the University of Houston. 

In 2018, an engineering building at the  Cullen College was renamed the Durga D. and Sushila Agrawal Engineering Research Building.

Research
The Cullen College posted research expenditures of $30+ million in the fiscal year 2019.

Research thrust areas
Biomedical-related research at the college had expenditures totaling $4.2 million in the 2011 fiscal year. Projects include research into biosensing/bioimaging, molecular recognition, neuroengineering and drug development/delivery. The college's research expenditures in the energy arena totaled approximately $4.8 million during 2011 fiscal year. Projects include investigations into superconductivity, lean burn engines, biofuels, offshore wind power, and tight gas deposits. The college's sustainability research thrust covers investigations into infrastructure and the environment. These include investigations into diesel vehicle emissions and retrofit testing, urban ground watershed modeling, severe storm management, airborne laser mapping, and concrete structures.

Research centers
The Cullen College has four research centers: the National Center for Airborne Laser Mapping, the Texas Center for Clean Engines, Emissions & Fuels, the Energy Devices Fabrication Laboratory, and the University of Houston Nanofabrication Facility.

Nanofabrication Facility
Managed by the Cullen College of Engineering, the University of Houston Nanofabrication facility was developed in cooperation with the Alliance for NanoHealth. The facility features a 3,300 square feet of cleanroom space equipped with devices for prototyping and characterization.

National Center for Airborne Laser Mapping
The National Center for Airborne Laser Mapping acquires airborne light detection and ranging (LiDAR) imagery for clients on a fee for service basis. The Center is operated in partnership with the University of California, Berkeley. NCALM is supported by the National Science Foundation and is associated with the multi-disciplinary Geosensing Systems Engineering and Science graduate program at the University of Houston.

Notable alumni
 Bill Callegari, member of the Texas House of Representatives
 Rod Canion, co-founder and former president and chief executive officer of Compaq Computers
 Maurizio Cheli, European Space Agency astronaut
 Nancy Currie, NASA Astronaut
 Bonnie Dunbar, NASA astronaut, former president of the Museum of Flight
 J.D. Kimmel, former professional football player for the Washington Redskins and Green Bay Packers.
 John D. Olivas, NASA astronaut
 Hubert Vo, member of the Texas House of Representatives
 Rex Walheim, NASA astronaut

References

External links
 

Engineering
Engineering schools and colleges in the United States
Engineering universities and colleges in Texas
Educational institutions established in 1941
1941 establishments in Texas